The 1975 CFL season is considered to be the 22nd season in modern-day Canadian football, although it is officially the 18th Canadian Football League season.

CFL News in 1975
Calgary became the first city in the Canadian Prairie Provinces to host the Grey Cup championship game. The CFL changed the rules on blocking by allowing contact to be above waist level on punt returns. The two-point convert was introduced to the league, as was the option after a field goal attempt by one team (regardless of whether it was made or not) to let the opposing team either kick off or scrimmage from their own 35-yard line (the latter option was eliminated in 2009, but was reinstated the next year).

Tragedy struck the CFL on October 11, when Hamilton Tiger-Cats star defensive lineman Tom Pate suffered an aneurysm in the fourth quarter against the Stampeders at McMahon Stadium. Pate never regains consciousness and would in two days die, at the age of 23. A year later, the CFLPA announced the Tom Pate Memorial Award in his honour to be awarded to the player who best personifies a unique combination of outstanding sportsmanship and dedication to the league and the community.

Regular season standings

Final regular season standings
Note: GP = Games Played, W = Wins, L = Losses, T = Ties, PF = Points For, PA = Points Against, Pts = Points

Bold text means that they have clinched the playoffs.
Edmonton and Ottawa have first round byes.

Grey Cup playoffs

The Edmonton Eskimos are the 1975 Grey Cup champions, defeating the Montreal Alouettes, 9–8, at Calgary's McMahon Stadium. This was the first Grey Cup game to be held in the prairies. Montreal's Steve Ferrughelli (RB) was named the Grey Cup's Most Valuable Player on Offence and Lewis Cook (DB) was named the Grey Cup's Most Valuable Player on Defence. Edmonton's Dave Cutler (K) was named Grey Cup's Most Valuable Canadian.

Playoff bracket

CFL Leaders
 CFL Passing Leaders
 CFL Rushing Leaders
 CFL Receiving Leaders

1975 CFL All-Stars

Offence
QB – Ron Lancaster, Saskatchewan Roughriders
RB – Willie Burden, Calgary Stampeders
RB – Art Green, Ottawa Rough Riders
RB – Johnny Rodgers, Montreal Alouettes
TE – Peter Dalla Riva, Montreal Alouettes
TE – Tony Gabriel, Ottawa Rough Riders
WR – George McGowan, Edmonton Eskimos
C – Wayne Conrad, Montreal Alouettes
C – Al Wilson, BC Lions
OG – Dave Braggins, Montreal Alouettes
OG – Willie Martin, Edmonton Eskimos
OT – Charlie Turner, Edmonton Eskimos
OT – Dan Yochum, Montreal Alouettes

Defence
DT – John Helton, Calgary Stampeders
DT – Glen Weir, Montreal Alouettes
DE – Jim Corrigall, Toronto Argonauts
DE – Bill Baker, BC Lions
LB – Jerry Campbell, Ottawa Rough Riders
LB – Larry Cameron, BC Lions
LB – Mike Widger, Montreal Alouettes
DB – Rod Woodward, Ottawa Rough Riders
DB – Dick Adams, Ottawa Rough Riders
DB – Lorne Richardson, Saskatchewan Roughriders
DB – Vernon Roberson, Calgary Stampeders
DB – Dickie Harris, Montreal Alouettes

1975 Eastern All-Stars

Offence
QB – Tom Clements, Ottawa Rough Riders
RB – Doyle Orange, Toronto Argonauts
RB – Art Green, Ottawa Rough Riders
RB – Johnny Rodgers, Montreal Alouettes
TE – Peter Dalla Riva, Montreal Alouettes
TE – Tony Gabriel, Ottawa Rough Riders
WR – Terry Evanshen, Hamilton Tiger-Cats
C – Wayne Conrad, Montreal Alouettes
OG – Dave Braggins, Montreal Alouettes
OG – Tom Schuette, Ottawa Rough Riders
OT – Jeff Turcotte, Ottawa Rough Riders
OT – Dan Yochum, Montreal Alouettes

Defence
DT – Granville Liggins, Toronto Argonauts
DT – Glen Weir, Montreal Alouettes
DE – Jim Corrigall, Toronto Argonauts
DE – Junior Ah You, Montreal Alouettes
LB – Jerry Campbell, Ottawa Rough Riders
LB – Mark Kosmos, Ottawa Rough Riders
LB – Mike Widger, Montreal Alouettes
DB – Rod Woodward, Ottawa Rough Riders
DB – Dick Adams, Ottawa Rough Riders
DB – Wayne Tosh, Ottawa Rough Riders
DB – Larry Uteck, Toronto Argonauts
DB – Dickie Harris, Montreal Alouettes

1975 Western All-Stars

Offence
QB – Ron Lancaster, Saskatchewan Roughriders
RB – Willie Burden, Calgary Stampeders
RB – George Reed, Saskatchewan Roughriders
RB – Lou Harris, BC Lions
TE – Tyrone Walls, Edmonton Eskimos
WR – Rhett Dawson, Saskatchewan Roughriders
WR – George McGowan, Edmonton Eskimos
C – Al Wilson, BC Lions
OG – Ralph Galloway, Saskatchewan Roughriders
OG – Willie Martin, Edmonton Eskimos
OT – Charlie Turner, Edmonton Eskimos
OT – Layne McDowell, BC Lions

Defence
DT – John Helton, Calgary Stampeders
DT – Tim Roth, Saskatchewan Roughriders
DE – George Wells, Saskatchewan Roughriders
DE – Bill Baker, BC Lions
LB – Harry Walters, Winnipeg Blue Bombers
LB – Larry Cameron, BC Lions
LB – Joe Forzani, Calgary Stampeders
DB – Ted Dushinski, Saskatchewan Roughriders
DB – Brian Herosian, Winnipeg Blue Bombers
DB – Lorne Richardson, Saskatchewan Roughriders
DB – Vernon Roberson, Calgary Stampeders
DB – Jim Marshall, Saskatchewan Roughriders
DB – Larry Highbaugh, Edmonton Eskimos

1975 CFL Awards
CFL's Most Outstanding Player Award – Willie Burden (RB), Calgary Stampeders
CFL's Most Outstanding Canadian Award – Jim Foley (WR), Ottawa Rough Riders
CFL's Most Outstanding Defensive Player Award – Jim Corrigall (DE), Toronto Argonauts
CFL's Most Outstanding Offensive Lineman Award – Charlie Turner (OT), Edmonton Eskimos
CFL's Most Outstanding Rookie Award – Tom Clements (QB), Ottawa Rough Riders
CFL's Coach of the Year – George Brancato, Ottawa Rough Riders

References 

CFL
Canadian Football League seasons